John Mansi may refer to:
John Louis Mansi (1926–2010), British television and film actor
John Domenico Mansi (1692–1769), Italian prelate, theologian, scholar and historian